St Catherine's College, a Catholic secondary school for girls, operates in the Wellington suburb of Kilbirnie in New Zealand. The Sisters of Mercy founded St Catherine's in 1919 initially as a primary school before becoming a secondary school in 1950.

On 30 March 1983, St Catherine's College became an integrated school under the Private Schools Conditional Integration Act of 1975. The Board of Trustees was first elected in 1989 and is responsible for the governance of the College. In recent years a new multi-functional hall, called "Mercy Hall", has been opened as well as a Food Technology Centre, a Music Suite, and a new Design Arts Centre. The college also has a new administration area, a chapel, and specialist and multi functional teaching areas which were completed in September 2016.

References

Sources
 
 Ernest Richard Simmons, Brief history of the Catholic Church in New Zealand, Catholic Publications Centre, Auckland, 1978.
 Michael King, God's farthest outpost : a history of Catholics in New Zealand, Viking, Auckland 1997.  
 Mary de Porres Flannigan R.S.M., Mercy comes to Wellington : a history of St. Mary’s College, St. Mary's College Board of Trustees, Wellington, 2000. 
 Michael O'Meeghan S.M., Steadfast in hope : the story of the Catholic Archdiocese of Wellington 1850-2000, Dunmore press, Palmerston North, 2003.

Educational institutions established in 1950
Girls' schools in New Zealand
Catholic secondary schools in the Wellington Region
Schools in Wellington City
1950 establishments in New Zealand
Sisters of Mercy schools